Osiedle Majowe is a municipal neighbourhood of the city of Szczecin, Poland. The neighbourhood is situated in Prawobrzeże, on the right bank of Oder river, south-east of the Szczecin Old Town, and Middle Town. As of December 2019, it had a population of 7,121.

References 

Neighbourhoods of Szczecin